Hynek Bílek (born 25 December 1981 in Olomouc) is a Czech former ice dancer. With partner Lucie Kadlčáková representing the Czech Republic, he placed as high as 10th at the World Junior Championships and won three ISU Junior Grand Prix medals. Bílek teamed up with Ivana Dlhopolčeková around 2003. Representing Slovakia, they won senior international medals at the 2004 Golden Spin of Zagreb, Ondrej Nepela Memorial, and Pavel Roman Memorial.

Following retirement from competition, Bílek worked at an Olomouc branch of the Komerční banka, however, in June 2010, he was sentenced to six years in prison for defrauding clients of 15 million Czech koruna.

Programs

With Dlhopolčeková

With Kadlčáková

Competitive highlights

With Dlhopolčeková for Slovakia

With Kadlčáková for the Czech Republic

References

External links 
 
 

Czech male ice dancers
1981 births
Living people
Sportspeople from Olomouc
Czech fraudsters
People convicted of fraud